The Spirit of Detroit is a monument with a large bronze statue created by Marshall Fredericks and located at the Coleman A. Young Municipal Center on Woodward Avenue in Detroit, Michigan.

Description
The Spirit of Detroit is a monument with a large bronze statue created by Marshall Fredericks and located at the Coleman A. Young Municipal Center on Woodward Avenue in Detroit, Michigan.  Cast in Oslo, Norway, the 26-foot (7.9 m), 9-ton sculpture sits on a 60-ton marble base and it was the largest cast bronze statue since the Renaissance.

In its left hand, the large seated figure holds a gilt bronze sphere emanating rays to symbolize God. The people in the figure's right hand are a family group symbolizing all human relationships.

Fredericks did not originally name the sculpture and the name came from the citizens of Detroit based on an inscription from 2 Corinthians (3:17) on the marble wall behind it:

The 36 x 45 foot semicircular wall includes the seals of the City of Detroit and Wayne County.  A plaque in front of the sculpture bears the following inscription: "The artist expresses the concept that God, through the spirit of man, is manifested in the family, the noblest human relationship."

History

The sculpture was commissioned on August 2, 1955 for a cost of $58,000 (equivalent to $415,000 in ).  Fredericks considered the statue to be part of his civic responsibility and waived the commissioning cost.  As part of the design of the divine elements of the sculpture, Fredericks met with several religious groups.  Fredericks shipped a scale model from the United States to Oslo, Norway for casting.  After casting, the sculpture underwent acidic treatments for several weeks to oxidize the bronze and to create the warm, aged green color.  The thickness of the bronze is 3/8 inches up to 1.5 inches.  Steel framework was constructed to protect the sculpture during transport.  Additional protection for the sculpture was provided using wooden beams, wooden platforms, and burlap covering, for a total shipping weight of 12 tons.  For shipping, the sculpture was placed facedown onto a wooden platform.  The sculpture was transported by the Fjell Line, who chartered the German freighter Thomas Schulte.  After the 4,800 mile journey across the Atlantic Ocean and through the Saint Lawrence Seaway, the freighter arrived at the Port of Detroit on September 20, 1958.  The Thomas Schulte was the only freighter with sufficient below deck storage space to accommodate the sculpture while still being able to navigate the Saint Lawrence Seaway.  As part of the shipment, four miniature scale models of the sculpture were included to aid with customs clearance.  The sculpture was delivered to the Detroit City-County Building and installed onto the marble base for the September 23, 1958 dedication ceremony.

The Marshall M. Fredericks Sculpture Museum has the original plaster head for The Spirit of Detroit, as well as a quarter-scale plaster model.

The sculpture has regular maintenance, as well as restorations.  Once a year, the sculpture is cleaned with non-ionic, biogradable detergents and customized petroleum-based waxes are used for protection.  The annual maintenance also includes applying heat to the bronze surface and cupric nitrate in order to preserve the green color and patina.  In 1984, the sculpture was covered in plastic while the marble panels behind the statue were replaced.  The statue underwent a restoration , funded by foundations and other private donations.  For the sculpture's 50th anniversary, funds from operational savings and energy conservation totalling $170,000 were used for restoration improvements.  In 2018, the sculpture had routine maintenance completed which involved touching up the green patina, as well as the gold figures and sphere.  On September 21, 2018, the City of Detroit had a ceremony to celebrate the 60th anniversary of the sculpture.

In 2017, Spirit Plaza was initially constructed and subsequent upgrades completed in 2019 and paid for by $800,000 in bond funds have yielded a 20,000 square-foot plaza with a playground, stationary musical instruments, tables, chairs, vehicle charging stations, and drinking fountains.

In 2013 art dealer and art historian Eric Ian Hornak Spoutz was quoted in The Detroit News stating that the value of the statue is in excess of $1 million.  In 2017, the Detroit-Wayne Joint Building Authority said that based on the most recent appraisal of the sculpture, it would cost $6 million to repair significant damage.

Uses as a community symbol

As one of Detroit's most easily identifiable landmarks, a sketch or depiction of the statue appears as the central element of most of the logos of Detroit's city departments and services.  During the 1980s, a facsimile of the statue was featured on the Detroit Police Department's insignia and on the sides of its police cars.  An image of the statue appears on the "Spirit of Detroit Award" certificate, which is issued by the Detroit City Council to a person, event, or organization deemed to have performed an outstanding achievement or service to the citizens of Detroit.  The sculpture is the main image on Detroit Community Scrip.

The Spirit of Detroit represents local sports teams, such as when it is dressed in sports jerseys to celebrate local professional teams competing in the playoffs.  As the number of sports and non-sports requests for the sculpture to wear jerseys increased, there began to be concerns about damage to the sculpture and starting in 2017, the Detroit-Wayne Joint Building Authority began new rules for having a jersey displayed on the statue, including winning a championship and paying $25,000.  The payment was intended to cover the restoration costs after a jersey is removed, including cleaning, reapplying the patina, and reapplying the wax.  Another example of local sports team representation is the use of an image of the sculpture as part of the crest of the Detroit City Football Club.

The sculpture has also been involved with arts events, such as being dressed in a tuxedo in 1999 during a visit by the Three Tenors.  The ceremonial naming of the section of the John C. Lodge Freeway running from Livernois to I-94 in honor of Aretha Franklin was held in front of the sculpture in 2019.   Spirit Plaza was the site of a floral tribute, which included 3,000 roses, that commemorated Big Sean's Detroit 2 album release on September 4, 2020.

The Spirit of Detroit represents Detroit in media and video games, such as the 2011 Chrysler 200 Super Bowl commercial, "Born of Fire", which featured Eminem along with Detroit landmarks, and the 2018 video game Detroit: Become Human.

In 2020, The Spirit of Detroit wore a blue-green shirt and a white ribbon to commemorate medical and "essential" workers during the COVID-19 pandemic.  Two people installed the 420 square foot polyester poplin shirt and three foot ribbon.

Gallery

See also

Detroit
Bronze sculpture
Marshall M. Fredericks Sculpture Museum
Portlandia

References

External links

The City of Detroit: History of the "Spirit of Detroit" Statue
Marshall M. Fredericks Sculpture Museum: The Spirit of Detroit

1958 sculptures
Bronze sculptures in Michigan
Civic personifications
Monuments and memorials in Detroit
Statues in Michigan
1958 establishments in Michigan
Sculptures of men in Michigan
Sculptures by Marshall Fredericks
Colossal statues in the United States